Bueng Boraphet is the largest freshwater swamp and lake in central Thailand. It covers an area of 224 km2 east of Nakhon Sawan, south of the Nan River close to its confluence with the Ping River. This swamp can be seen from the train window between Bueng Boraphet  and Thap Krit stations on the Northern railway line.

Originally the area was covered by a large swamp, which was flooded in 1930 with the building of a dam to improve fishing.

This is the only known site for the white-eyed river martin which used to winter there, but has not been seen since 1980, and may be extinct.

Once in the past Siamese tiger perch can be considered the most famous fish species here, until it was said that "If anyone comes to Bueng Borapet and doesn't eat this species of fish it is as if that person has never arrived". But now it is probably  completely extinct here, from being caught too much, both for consumption and for trade in the aquarium fish industry.

A near-threatened species, the marsh grassbird, was first discovered in Thailand here in early December 2019.

One hundred and six square kilometres of the lake were declared a non-hunting area in 1975. In 2000 it was designated a wetland of international importance by the Thai government.

References

External links

Wetlands of SE Asia

Boraphet
Non-hunting areas of Thailand
Geography of Nakhon Sawan province
Protected areas established in 1975
1975 establishments in Thailand